The 2012–13 season was the club's 104th season, having been founded as Dundee Hibernian in 1909 and their 15th consecutive season in the Scottish Premier League, having competed in it since its inauguration in 1998–99. United also competed in the Europa League, League Cup and the Scottish Cup.

Summary

Season
United finished sixth in the Scottish Premier League. They reached the Third qualifying round of the Europa League, the Quarter-final of the League Cup and the Semi-final of the Scottish Cup.

Management
They began the season under the management of Peter Houston. But on 28 January 2013, Houston left the club by mutual consent, having previously announced his decision to leave at the end of the season. Stevie Campbell and Paul Hegarty were due to take over as caretaker manager's for their match against Motherwell the following day, although the match was postponed. Two days later Partick Thistle manager Jackie McNamara was appointed on a three-year contract, with Simon Donnelly appointed as his assistant.

Results & fixtures

Pre season

Scottish Premier League

Europa League

Dundee United entered at the Third qualifying round.

Scottish League Cup

Scottish Cup

Player statistics

Captains

Squad information
Last updated 19 May 2013

|}

Disciplinary record
Includes all competitive matches.
Last updated 19 May 2013

Team statistics

League table

Division summary

Transfers

Players in

Players out

References

Dundee United
Dundee United
Dundee United F.C. seasons